Cysticercosis cutis is a cutaneous condition caused by Taenia solium.

See also 
 Skin lesion

References 

Parasitic infestations, stings, and bites of the skin